Castilleja del Campo is a city located in the province of Seville, Spain. According to the 2006 census (INE), the city has a population of 651 inhabitants.

References

External links
Castilleja del Campo - Sistema de Información Multiterritorial de Andalucía

Municipalities of the Province of Seville